Mormoiron is a commune in the Vaucluse department in the Provence-Alpes-Côte d'Azur region in southeastern France.

Geography and geology
Mormoiron is located 12 km East of Carpentras; also nearby are Mont Ventoux and Avignon. The soil is mainly composed of sand, ochre and gypsum.

Prehistory and antiquity
The commune's area was occupied prehistorically (approximately 100,000 BC), as is evidenced by the discovery of bifaces and Pottery. Evidence from the twenty-first century BC points to trade relations with Phocaea and ancient Marseille.

Roman colonization left behind altars to Mercury, coins from the Augustan and Trojan reigns, and various other artefacts.

The siege walls surrounding 16th century Porte du Brochier and the 17th century Porte de la Bonne Font are still present today.

See also
Communes of the Vaucluse department

References

Communes of Vaucluse